The American Red Cross Volunteer Life Saving Corps, also known as the Life-Saving Service of the American Red Cross, is a lifeguard body of the American Red Cross that began in 1914 as a response to the growing number of drowning deaths in the United States.

History

Recognizing an epidemic of water-related death, in 1912 Wilbert Longfellow presented a plan to the American Red Cross for improved water safety. The Red Cross adopted the nation-wide plan in January 1914, and established the Red Cross Life Saving Corps. The corps is the forerunner of the present-day Red Cross water safety program. Longfellow organized the lifesaving program.

The Jacksonville Beach volunteer corps is the last of its kind in the country. The American Red Cross Volunteer Life Saving Corps Station is listed in the National Register of Historic Places Program.

See also
American Red Cross Volunteer Life Saving Corps Station

References 

American Red Cross
Volunteer organizations in the United States